The Charles S. Peirce Society (CSPS) is an American organization which purpose is to enhance "study of and communication about the work of Charles S. Peirce and its ongoing influence in the many fields of intellectual endeavor to which he contributed". It was founded in 1946. Its Transactions of the Charles S. Peirce Society, an academic quarterly specializing in pragmatism and American philosophy, has appeared since 1965.

References

External links
Official website

Philosophical societies in the United States
1946 establishments in the United States
Organizations established in 1946
American philosophy
Charles Sanders Peirce